Gelderland is a province of the Netherlands.

Gelderland may also refer to:
 Guelders, a historical region in the Holy Roman Empire
 Gelderland horse, a breed of horses from Gelderland
 HNLMS Gelderland, two ships of the Royal Netherlands Navy